Jamal al-Din al-Ghaznawi, was a Sunni Hanafi jurist, theologian, and Kalam scholar of the Maturidi school.

Name 
Jamal al-Din Ahmad b. Muhammad b. Mahmud b. Sa'id b. Nuh al-Qabisi, widely known as al-Taj al-Hanafi, it has also been said his name was Muhammad instead of Ahmad.

Birth 
The date of his birth is unknown, nor are there many authentic circumstances related of his life.

Life 
Not much of his early academic life is known nor documented except that many have mentioned his knowledge and his written works.

He lived in Aleppo for a period of time, and worked as a lecturer at al-Madrasa al-Nuriyya.

Teachers 

Amongst his teachers was 'Ala' al-Din al-Kasani, author of Bada'i al-Sana'i (d. 587/1191), who died about a hundred years after Sarakhsi.

Books 
Among his printed works are:
 Kitab Usul al-Din, The Book of the Principles of Religion (Islamic Theology).
 Al-Hawi al-Qudsi fi Furu' al-Fiqh al-Hanafi, called so because written in Jerusalem (al-Quds).

and many more other works.

Death 
He died in 593 A.H. = 1196/7 A.D. in Aleppo, Syria. And he was buried near the tomb of Prophet Ibrahim, according to Ibn al-'Adim, in his book "Bughyat al-Talab fi Tarikh Halab".

See also 
 Abu Hanifa
 Abu Mansur al-Maturidi
 Abu al-Yusr al-Bazdawi
 Abu al-Mu'in al-Nasafi
 Abu Ishaq al-Saffar al-Bukhari
 Akmal al-Din al-Babarti
 Nur al-Din al-Sabuni
 Najm al-Din 'Umar al-Nasafi
 Sa'd al-Din al-Taftazani
 List of Ash'aris and Maturidis
 List of Muslim theologians

References 

Hanafis
Maturidis
12th-century Muslim theologians
People from Ghazni Province
Afghan Sunni Muslims
Sunni imams
Sunni fiqh scholars
Sunni Muslim scholars of Islam
Sharia judges
1196 deaths
1197 deaths